K.G.F: Chapter 2 is the soundtrack album, composed by Ravi Basrur, to the 2022 Indian Kannada language period action film of the same name directed by Prashanth Neel starring Yash, Sanjay Dutt, Srinidhi Shetty, Raveena Tandon and Prakash Raj.

Production 
Music sessions of the film began on April 2019, at Basrur's newly renovated recording studio in Bangalore. However, music production was disrupted in mid-March 2020 due to the COVID-19 pandemic, which was resumed during that May. After work on the film's music and score being completed, Basrur later edited the score and songs, during mid-2021. The Naik Brothers (Laxman and Sandesh Datta), recorded two songs "Toofan" and "Sultan", used in the Hindi-dubbed version of the film. They stated "We went there and he dubbed four songs in Telugu and Kannada in our voice. Later, COVID-19 lockdown happened. After a long wait of two years, they recorded two songs for the Hindi dubbed version titled Toofan and Sultan and finalised for the movie".

Release 
The music rights of Hindi version was bought by MRT Music. On 21 March 2022, the first single titled "Toofan" was released from the album. The song depicts the rise of Rocky (Yash) as a saviour of enslaved people in the gold mines of Kolar, as depicted in the predecessor's plot. It crossed over 26 million views within 24 hours of its release. On 6 April 2022, the second single titled "Gagana Nee" was released, On 13 April 2022, the third single titled "Sulthana" was released. On 14 April 2022, the fourth single titled "Mehabooba" was released. On 16 April 2022, the makers released the soundtrack album, containing four songs. On 24 April 2022, the fifth single titled "The Monster Song" was also released.

Track listing

Kannada

Telugu

Hindi

Tamil

Malayalam

Album credits

Original soundtrack 
Credits adapted from Lahari Music

Song writer(s) 

 Ravi Basrur (Composer, Arranger)

Performers 

 Composition, production, musical arrangements, recording, mixing, mastering – Ravi Basrur
 Lyrics – Ravi Basrur, Shabbir Ahmed, Ramajogayya Sastry, Madhurakavi, Sudhamsu, Kinnal Raj, Deepak V Bharti, Aditi Sagar

References 

Kannada film soundtracks
2022 soundtrack albums
T-Series (company) soundtrack albums